Bound Brook Island is an island in Barnstable County, Massachusetts. Great Beach Hill is located south of Bound Brook Island. Bound Brook formerly made an island of this land during the spring and fall tides.

References

Islands of Massachusetts
Islands of Barnstable County, Massachusetts